Sibinia suturalis is a species of leguminous seed weevil in the family Curculionidae. It is found in North America.

References

Further reading

 
 
 
 
 

Curculioninae
Articles created by Qbugbot
Beetles described in 1908